Rhagades amasina is a moth of the family Zygaenidae. It is known from  Bulgaria (Sakar), Greece (Kos and Rhodes), Turkey, northern Syria and Lebanon.

The length of the forewings is 9–10.5 mm for males and 8.5–9.5 mm for females.

The larvae feed on Prunus and Crataegus species. They skeletonise the leaves of their host plant. Pupation takes in place in a white cocoon.

References

C. M. Naumann, W. G. Tremewan: The Western Palaearctic Zygaenidae. Apollo Books, Stenstrup 1999, 

Procridinae
Moths of Asia
Moths of Europe
Moths described in 1851
Taxa named by Gottlieb August Wilhelm Herrich-Schäffer